C. benedictus may refer to:

 Carduus benedictus, a thistle used as food plants by the larvae of some Lepidoptera species
 Cnicus benedictus, a thistle native to the Mediterranean region

See also
 Benedictus (disambiguation)